Vanlue High School is a public high school in Vanlue, Ohio.  It is the only high school in the Vanlue Local School District. The nickname is Wildcats. School colors are scarlet and gray. It is a member of the Blanchard Valley Conference.
 and National Junior Classical League.

References

External links
 District Website

High schools in Hancock County, Ohio
Public high schools in Ohio